Vahase is a  Estonian islet in the Gulf of Riga. Administratively Vahase belongs to the Abruka village in Lääne-Saare Parish, Saare County.

Vahase arose from the sea about thousand years ago. The island has a tiny forest with junipers, oaks, and pines.

Because of shallow water Vahase is accessible from Abruka by foot. There's only one farmstead on the island.

Writer Albert Uustulnd has described Vahase in his novel Tuulte tallermaa.

See also
List of islands of Estonia

References

Uninhabited islands of Estonia
Saaremaa Parish
Estonian islands in the Baltic